Yogesh Gholap is an Indian politician, from Nashik district. He is Member of the 13th Maharashtra Legislative Assembly from Deolali Vidhan Sabha constituency as member of  Shiv Sena. He is son of Ex Minister of Maharashtra and Shiv Sena Deputy Leader Babanrao Gholap.

Positions held
 2014: Elected to Maharashtra Legislative Assembly

See also
 Nashik Lok Sabha constituency

References

External links
 Shiv Sena Official website

Shiv Sena politicians
Maharashtra MLAs 2014–2019
Living people
People from Nashik district
Marathi politicians
Year of birth missing (living people)